Rui Abel Maia Coentrão (born 25 July 1992) is a Portuguese professional footballer who plays for F.C. Tirsense as a left back or a left winger.

Club career
Born in Vila do Conde, Coentrão spent most of his youth career with nearby Varzim SC, while also having four years in Sporting CP's academy. He made his senior debut with the former in the third tier in the 2011–12 season, won by his team.

On 29 June 2013, Coentrão was loaned to Segunda Liga club Leixões S.C. for the upcoming campaign. He made 40 total appearances for the side from Matosinhos, and scored the only goal of an away win against Atlético Clube de Portugal on 27 October.

Upon returning to Varzim, Coentrão was a first-team regular, winning promotion to the second division in 2014–15 and playing several years at that level. On 31 July 2016, he scored twice in a 2–1 victory at S.C. Olhanense in the first round of the Taça da Liga. The following 21 May, in the last game of the season, he was sent off in a 3–0 home loss to relegated F.C. Vizela.

International career
Coentrão won four caps for Portugal at under-21 level, in as many friendlies. His first arrived on 14 November 2012, in a 3–2 defeat of Scotland in Setúbal where he came on as a late substitute.

Personal life
Coentrão's second cousin, Fábio, played in the same position. He was a long-time Portugal international, and his clubs included S.L. Benfica and Real Madrid.

References

External links

1992 births
Living people
People from Vila do Conde
Sportspeople from Porto District
Portuguese footballers
Association football defenders
Association football wingers
Liga Portugal 2 players
Segunda Divisão players
Campeonato de Portugal (league) players
Varzim S.C. players
Leixões S.C. players
F.C. Tirsense players
Portugal youth international footballers
Portugal under-21 international footballers